The XX National Sports Week (abbreviated as PON XX), also called PON XX Papua or PON Papua 2021, was the twentieth edition of the Indonesian National Sports Week, hosted by Papua. The event took place from 2 October to 15 October 2021. Lukas Enembe Stadium was the main venue for this edition, both the opening and closing ceremonies. This event was originally going to be held in 2020, but was postponed to 2021 due to Covid-19 pandemic. This edition was the first PON held in the province, as well as in the Western New Guinea region and Eastern Indonesian Time areas.

Bids 
Papua successfully defeated Bali and Aceh to host PON XX / 2020.  Gaining the most votes in the voting for the prospective host of the National Sports Week (PON) XX in 2020 by winning 66 votes at the Annual Member Meeting of the National Sports Committee of Indonesia (KONI).

Venue 

There are one city and three regencies that will host the 2021 PON: Jayapura City, Jayapura Regency, Merauke Regency, and Mimika Regency.

Games

Sport
The 2020 edition will feature more sports than the previous edition. Based on KONI Decree No. 100 of 2019, a total of 56 sports were competed in the games. Previously, the central KONI determined a number of 47 sports to be competed, but returned later to 56 according to the hosts ability. Ten sports that were removed were cycling, bridge, dance, gateball, golf, petanque, water skiing, soft tennis, table tennis and woodball. Meanwhile, electronic sports are also competed as an exhibition sport.

 Aerosport
 
 
 
 
 
 Aquatics
 
 
 
 
 
 
 
 
 Baseball/Softball
 
 
 Basketball
 
 
 Bodybuilding, Powerlifting, Weightlifting
 
 
 
 
 

 
 
 
 BMX
 Mountain biking
 Road
 Track

 Football
 
 
 
 Artistic gymnastics
 Rhythmic gymnastics
 Aerobic gymnastics
 
 Field hockey (2)
 Indoor hockey (2)
 
 
 Human-powered boat racing
 
 
 
 
 
 
 
 
 
 
 
 
 
 
 
 
 Indoor volleyball (2)
 Beach volleyball (2)
 
 Freestyle (17)
 Greco-Roman (9)

Participating Provincial Sports Committees

Medal table
A total of 2212 medals—688 gold, 675 silver, and 849 bronze—were awarded to athletes.

References

External links 
 

Pekan Olahraga Nasional
Pekan Olahraga Nasional
2021 in Indonesian sport
Pekan Olahraga Nasional